FC Arda 1924 Kardzhali is a Bulgarian association football club based in Kardzhali, which currently competes in the First League, the top tier of the Bulgarian football league system.

It was founded on 13 October 1924, as an association football branch of a larger sports society in the town. The club was reestablished in 2015, after its former entity was dissolved.

Named after the Arda river, a tributary of the Maritsa, Arda's home ground is the Arena Arda in Kardzhali, which has a capacity of 15,000 spectators. For the majority of its existence, the club regularly participated in the Second League, with its highest-ever ranking a second-place finish during the 1955–56 Bulgarian Second League. Arda have also reached the quarter-finals of the Bulgarian Cup once, it happened during the 1959–60 season of the competition.

In 2018–19, Arda won the Second League promotion play-off against Septemvri Sofia, resulting in the club's first-ever appearance in the Bulgarian top division.

History

First Arda team (1924–2013)
Arda was established on August 10, 1924 under the name Rodopski Sokol, but later took the name Arda, derived from the nearby Arda River. From 1945 to 1957 the team was named Minyor until a year later when the previous name was put in use again. In 1956, the club finished as a runner-up in the B Group. They also reached the quarter-finals of the Bulgarian Cup during the 1959–60 campaign of the competition. In 1988 they secured the third place in the B Group. The Kardzhali club spend most of its time in the second and third levels of Bulgarian football, before getting dissolved in 2013 due to financial troubles.

Refounding (2015–2017)
The team suffered relegation from the V Group in 2013 and didn't compete in any league division until 2015 when they returned to the A Regional Group after reestablishment. In 2016, Arda achieved promotion to the Bulgarian Third League after a successful season and a 3–0 win in the play-off match against Lyubimets.

PSI Group ownership and promotion to the elite (2017–present)
In early June 2017, the club was purchased by Bulgarian road construction company PSI Group, in an attempt to develop a football project, inspired by the domestic and international success of Ludogorets. Two weeks later, former Levski Sofia player Elin Topuzakov was appointed as head coach and Emil Kremenliev was hired as sporting director. Subsequently, Petar Peshev was elected chairman of the club and was revealed that the new ownership would invest around €1 million in new signings, salaries and infrastructure around the stadium during the following South-East Third League season. All of this led to an amateur double during the 2017–18 season, as Arda won both its group and the Cup of Bulgarian Amateur Football League, resulting in a promotion to the Bulgarian Second League.

After the unsatisfactory results in the first 5 rounds, Elin Topuzakov was released as a manager and Stoycho Stoev was appointed, but on 6 March 2019 Stamen Belchev was appointed as the new manager, after Stoev reached an agreement with the Bulgarian champions Ludogorets Razgrad. The team improved greatly, eventually managing a 3rd-place finish, enabling them to participate in the play-offs against relegation-avoider PFC Septemvri Sofia to enter the top level of Bulgarian football. Arda eventually managed to win 0–1 over Septemvri at the Lokomotiv Stadium in Plovdiv, thus resulting in the club's first-time ever participation in the Bulgarian First League.

First Seasons in the Elite and Bulgarian Cup Final

Arda's first match in the Bulgarian top tier resulted in a 0–0 home draw against Botev Plovdiv. This was followed by an away 0–0 draw to Tsarsko Selo. Arda's first win came in the third round, when the team managed to beat Beroe Stara Zagora 3–1 at home. The game remained 1-1 up until the 90th minute, when Elisha Sam scored two goals in three minutes to give Arda the win. Arda then won their first away game in the top league, by beating Vitosa Bistritsa 1–3, extending their unbeaten run to four games. At the end of the first half of the season in December, Arda was in seventh place in the league, with seven wins, seven draws, and six losses. At the end of the regular season in June, Arda was in the relegation group. Despite this, on June 20, Arda mathematically secured their place in the First League for the upcoming season, after Botev Plovdiv beat Botev Vratsa 3–2.

Arda reached the final of the 2020–21 Bulgarian Cup, their first-ever participation at a final of the domestic cup. Arda faced CSKA Sofia, and lost by 1-0, in a closely fought game. A few days later, the team won the Europa Conference League play-off against Cherno More Varna and qualified for European tournament for first time in their history. In the Europa Conference League, Arda faced Israeli side Hapoel Be'er Sheva. Arda’s general inexperience with European football caused an upsetting 0-2 home loss, followed by a 4-0 away loss, which eliminated Arda from the Europa Conference League.

Honours 
First League
4th place (1): 2020–21

Second League
 Runners-up (1): 1955–56
 Third place (2): 1987–88, 2018–19

Third League
 Winners (1): 2017–18

A Regional Group
 Winners (1): 2015–16

Bulgarian Cup
 Runners-up  (1): 2020–21

Cup of Bulgarian Amateur Football League
 Winners (1): 2017–18

Players

First-team squad 

 

For recent transfers, see Transfers summer 2022 and Transfers winter 2022–23.

Out on loan

Foreign players
Up to twenty foreign nationals can be registered and given a squad number for the first team in the Bulgarian First League, however only five non-EU nationals can be used during a match day. Those non-EU nationals with European ancestry can claim citizenship from the nation their ancestors came from. If a player does not have European ancestry he can claim Bulgarian citizenship after playing in Bulgaria for 5 years.

Notable players
 
The footballers enlisted below have international caps for their respective countries or more than 100 caps for Arda. Players whose name is listed in bold represented their countries.
 

Bulgaria
 Dimitar Makriev
 Ventsislav Hristov
 Ventsislav Vasilev
 Radoslav Vasilev 
 Ivaylo Dimitrov 
 Spas Delev 
 Mihail Aleksandrov
 Svetoslav Kovachev
 Martin Lukov
 Radoslav Uzunov

Europe
 Rumyan Hovsepyan
 Darko Glišić
 Connor Randall

Africa
 Ilias Hassani
 David Kiki
 Alie Sesay

South America
 Matheus Leoni

Asia
 Rebin Sulaka

Goalscoring and appearance records

Players in bold are still playing for Arda.

European record

Matches

Records and notable stats

Club Records

 Biggest home win in First League: Arda Kardzhali 5–1 Lokomotiv Plovdiv (22 March 2022)
 Biggest away win in First League: Vitosha Bistritsa 1–3 Arda Kardzhali (2 August 2019)
 Biggest home loss in First League: Arda Kardzhali 0–4 Ludogorets Razgrad (12 February 2022)
 Biggest away loss in First League: Tsarsko Selo 4–0 Arda  Kardzhali (25 April 2021)
 Unbeaten streak in First League (single season): 11 (2020–21)
 Most consecutive wins in First League (single season): 3 (2020–21)

Personnel

Board of directors

Current technical body

Manager history

Seasons

League positions

Past seasons

References

External links 
 Club Profile at bgclubs.eu
 Official website

Arda
Arda
Arda
Arda